The Grand Hotel was a hotel located in Highmount, New York. It was built by the Ulster and Delaware Railroad in 1881 and closed in 1966. J. A. Wood was the building's architect.

Sitting on the side of Monka Hill, it had 418 rooms overlooking the Big Indian Valley towards Slide Mountain.

References

Defunct hotels in New York (state)
Catskills
Grand Hotel, Highmount, NY
Hotel buildings completed in 1881
1966 disestablishments in New York (state)
Hotels established in 1881
Railway hotels in the United States
1881 establishments in New York (state)